The Institute of Company Secretaries of India (ICSI) is a premier national professional body in India under the ownership of Ministry of Corporate Affairs, Government of India with the objective of promoting, regulating and developing the profession of company secretaries in India. It is headquartered in New Delhi, has four regional offices at New Delhi, Chennai, Kolkata and Mumbai, and has 70 chapters around the country.

A person is eligible to apply for membership by passing all three levels of examinations that is CSEET (earlier Foundation), Executive and Professional  prescribed by ICSI and completing Short term and Long term practical training.

The members of the ICSI are highly qualified Professionals playing key role in ensuring compliance with the laws and promoting sound Corporate Governance practices in Indian Corporates.

History

Institute of Company Secretaries of India was formed by enacting the Companies Secretary Act, 1980 by the Parliament of India.

Role of Company Secretary

Role of Company Secretary is considered as key managerial position with the responsibilities of compliance officer,person guiding board members,acting as risk manager,governance professional etc.

References
https://www.taxscan.in/cs-devendra-v-deshpande-elected-as-president-of-icsi-for-the-year-2022/149722/

Corporate governance in India
Professional associations based in India
Company secretaries
1968 establishments in India